The 1942 Nuneaton by-election was a parliamentary by-election held for the British House of Commons constituency of Nuneaton on 9 March 1942.  The seat had become vacant when the Labour Member of Parliament Reginald Fletcher was raised to the peerage as Baron Winster. He had held the seat since the 1935 general election.

During World War II, the parties in the war-time coalition government had agreed not to contest by-elections where a seat held by any of their parties fell vacant, so the Labour candidate, Frank Bowles  was returned unopposed.  He represented the constituency until his resignation in 1965 to allow the election of the Minister of Technology Frank Cousins.

See also
Nuneaton (UK Parliament constituency)
Nuneaton
1965 Nuneaton by-election
1967 Nuneaton by-election
List of United Kingdom by-elections

1942 elections in the United Kingdom
1942 in England
Unopposed by-elections to the Parliament of the United Kingdom (need citation)
By-elections to the Parliament of the United Kingdom in Warwickshire constituencies
Nuneaton and Bedworth
20th century in Warwickshire